José Gregorio Gómez (born 27 December 1963) is a Venezuelan footballer. He played in 13 matches for the Venezuela national football team from 1989 to 1993. He was also part of Venezuela's squad for the 1989 Copa América tournament.

References

External links
 

1963 births
Living people
Venezuelan footballers
Venezuela international footballers
Place of birth missing (living people)
Association football goalkeepers
People from Cojedes (state)